Carex ventosa, also known as Chatham Islands forest sedge, is a tussock-forming species of perennial sedge in the family Cyperaceae. It is native to the Chatham Islands.

Description
It has smooth culms that can be scabrous below the inflorescence.

Taxonomy
It was described by the botanist Charles Baron Clarke in 1906 as a part of the work Manual of the New Zealand Flora. The type specimen was collected by Henry Travers from Chatman Island. It has only one synonym; Carex mcclurgii as described by Petrie.

Distribution
The species is endemic to the Chatham Islands, and is found on Chatham Island, Pitt Island, Mangere Island, Little Mangere Island, Star Keys, Rabbit Island and Rangatira Island. It is widespread throughout the areas of lowland forest on the islands usuallu associated with areas of coastland forest, tall scrub and dune forest and is rarely found in areas of deep peat.

See also
List of Carex species

References

ventosa
Plants described in 1906
Taxa named by Charles Baron Clarke
Flora of the Chatham Islands